Without Love is a 1945 romantic comedy film directed by Harold S. Bucquet and starring Spencer Tracy, Katharine Hepburn, and Lucille Ball. Based on a 1942 play by Philip Barry, the film's screenplay was written by Donald Ogden Stewart.

Plot
Lonely widow Jamie Rowan (Katharine Hepburn) helps the war effort by marrying a military research scientist, Patrick Jamieson (Spencer Tracy), who has set up his lab in her house in Washington, D.C. Patrick has had all the worst of love, and Jamie all the best. They both believe a marriage could be a success without love, as it reduces the chances of jealousy and bickering and all the other marital disadvantages. But as the film progresses, the inevitable happens as they begin to fall in love with each other.

Cast
Spencer Tracy as Patrick Jamieson
Katharine Hepburn as Jamie Rowan
Lucille Ball as Kitty Trimble
Keenan Wynn as Quentin Ladd
Carl Esmond as Paul Carrell
Patricia Morison as Edwina Collins
Felix Bressart as Professor Ginza

Production
The original Philip Barry stage play debuted on Broadway at the St. James Theatre in 1942.  Katharine Hepburn starred as Jamie Rowan with actor/writer/director Elliott Nugent as Patrick Jamieson, the role Spencer Tracy would take in the film.  Audrey Christie played the Lucille Ball role of Kitty Trimble, and the cast included Royal Beal and Lauren Gilbert.

Barry wrote the part expressly for Hepburn, as he had previously done with The Philadelphia Story, a major Broadway hit for Hepburn which she turned into her 1940 comeback film, also starring Cary Grant and James Stewart, and also adapted for the screen by Donald Ogden Stewart.  Hepburn and Grant's 1938 film Holiday—which had already been a 1930 film—was based on a 1929 Barry play.

Without Love was the third film to co-star Hepburn and Tracy, and it would be the last film directed by Bucquet.  Lucille Ball would turn to this film's cinematographer, Karl Freund, six years later in her struggle to launch a filmed television show, unheard of at the time.

Reception
Bosley Crowther of The New York Times wrote that "you should all go to the theatre, for, despite its gab and weaknesses in spots, 'Without Love' is really most amusing." Variety gave a lukewarm review, faulting the film for "the general obviousness of it all, along with a somewhat static plot basis." Harrison's Reports called it "an amusing comedy-drama ... There is more talk than action, but the sparkling dialogue is a compensating factor." Wolcott Gibbs of The New Yorker wrote that the film had been changed significantly from the play but was "a very witty and engaging picture, recommended here without hesitation. Miss Hepburn and Mr. Tracy succeed brilliantly in the leading parts."

Filmink calls it the least known of the Tracy-Hepburn films, "absolutely, resolutely, and incredibly unmemorable."

Box office
According to MGM records the film earned $2,702,000 in the US and Canada and $1,082,000 elsewhere resulting in a profit of $619,000.

References

External links

1942 plays
American plays adapted into films
Broadway plays
Plays by Philip Barry
1945 films
1945 romantic comedy films
American black-and-white films
American romantic comedy films
American films based on plays
Films about marriage
Films directed by Harold S. Bucquet
Films scored by Bronisław Kaper
Films set in Washington, D.C.
Metro-Goldwyn-Mayer films
World War II films made in wartime
Films with screenplays by Donald Ogden Stewart
1940s English-language films